Babno Polje (in older sources also Babino Polje) is a village in the Municipality of Loška Dolina in the Inner Carniola region of Slovenia, on the border with Croatia.

Name
Babno Polje was attested in historical sources as Pabenfeld in 1402 and Pobenueld in 1449.

Church
The parish church in the settlement is dedicated to Saint Nicholas and belongs to the Ljubljana Archdiocese. It was first mentioned in written documents dating to 1526.

Climate
Statistically, Babno Polje is the coldest inhabited settlement in Slovenia.

References

External links 

Babno Polje on Geopedia

Populated places in the Municipality of Loška Dolina